The Iowa Hawkeyes women's basketball statistical leaders are individual statistical leaders of the Iowa Hawkeyes women's basketball program in various categories, including points, three-pointers, rebounds, assists, steals, and blocks. Within those areas, the lists identify single-game, single-season, and career leaders. The Hawkeyes represent the University of Iowa in the NCAA Division I Big Ten Conference.

Iowa began competing in intercollegiate women's basketball in 1974, before the NCAA governed women's sports; in that era, the main governing body for women's college sports was the Association of Intercollegiate Athletics for Women (AIAW). The NCAA began governing women's sports in the 1981–82 school year; after one year in which both the NCAA and AIAW held national championship events, the AIAW folded. Because of Iowa's relatively recent history in women's basketball, there is no "pre-modern" era of limited statistics; full box scores are available for all Iowa games, and the only rules change that seriously impacted statistical totals was the advent of the three-pointer, which was made mandatory in NCAA women's basketball in the 1987–88 season.

The NCAA has recorded individual scoring and rebounding totals since it began sponsoring women's sports championships. However, it did not officially record the other statistics included in this page until later. Assists were first officially recorded in women's basketball in the 1985–86 season. Blocks and steals were first officially recorded in 1987–88, the same season in which the use of the three-pointer was made mandatory. Iowa only includes three-point statistics since the national adoption of that rule, but otherwise includes statistics from the entire history of Iowa women's basketball.

These lists are updated through Iowa's game against Georgia in the second round of the 2023 NCAA tournament. Currently active players are indicated in bold. Iowa's record books list only the record-holder in single-game statistics (including ties for the top sppt) and not a full top 10.

Scoring

Three-pointers

Rebounds

Assists

Steals

Blocks

References

Lists of college basketball statistical leaders by team
Statistical